The purpose of the Sparks–Thomas Award, given by the American Chemical Society, Rubber Division, is to recognize and encourage outstanding contributions and innovations in the field of elastomers by younger scientists, technologists, and engineers. The award is named for Exxon scientists William J. Sparks and Robert M. Thomas, co-inventors of Butyl rubber.

Recipients
The following persons have received the award:

See also
 List of chemistry awards
 International Rubber Science Hall of Fame: Another ACS award
 Melvin Mooney Distinguished Technology Award
 Charles Goodyear Medal

References

External links

Chemistry awards
Awards of the American Chemical Society